The light heavyweight boxing competition at the 1980 Olympic Games in Moscow was held from 26 July to 2 August at the Olympiysky Sports Complex. 19 boxers from 19 nations competed.

Schedule

Results

References

Boxing at the 1980 Summer Olympics